Senator Mattoon may refer to:

Abner C. Mattoon (1814–1895), New York State Senate
Ebenezer Mattoon (1755–1843), Massachusetts State Senate